The Fast and the Furious: Drift (stylized as DRIFT) is an arcade racing video game developed and published by Raw Thrills. It is the fifth game based on the Fast and the Furious franchise. This game uses elements from F&F's third film, released a year prior.

Gameplay
Drift is an expanded and updated version of the first F&F arcade game, adding seven new tracks set in Japan and new cars, as well as a new soundtrack. New cars are the Ford GT, Ford Mustang, Dodge Viper, Dodge Challenger, Saleen S7, Mazda RX-8, Mazda RX-7, Pontiac Solstice and Chevrolet Camaro. Cars taken in a race are the Toyota Supra, Toyota MR2, the Mitsubishi Eclipse, Mitsubishi Lancer Evolution, Nissan 240SX, Toyota Celica, Dodge Charger, Chevrolet Corvette, Pontiac Firebird and Pontiac GTO. Like its predecessor, it has a PIN system that can save progress that has been made through the game by typing in a code.

Former Midway sound designer Jon Hey handled the audio development of this game.

References

External links
Raw Thrills, Inc. page

2007 video games
Racing video games
Street racing video games
Fast & Furious video games
Arcade video games
Arcade-only video games
Video games based on films
Video games set in Japan
Video games set in Tokyo
Video games developed in the United States
Raw Thrills games
Multiplayer and single-player video games